T. J. Paganetti (born August 4, 1989) is an American football coach who is the run game specialist and assistant tight ends coach for the Philadelphia Eagles of the National Football League (NFL). He previously served as the offensive quality control coach during the 2022 season and also previously served as an assistant coach for the University of Oregon.

Coaching career

Oregon (first stint) 
Paganetti began his coaching career while a student at the University of Oregon as an undergraduate offensive intern from 2007 until 2008. From 2009 until 2011, he served as a student assistant working with the offense and quarterbacks. In 2012, he was an offensive intern working with quarterbacks.

Philadelphia Eagles (first stint) 
In 2013, Paganetti was hired by the Philadelphia Eagles as an offensive analyst to serve under newly hired head coach Chip Kelly, who he coached with during his first stint at Oregon. He served in this role until 2014.

Oregon (second stint) 
Paganetti returned to Oregon from 2015 until 2016 and served as a graduate assistant after graduating from college.

Philadelphia Eagles (second stint) 
In 2017, Paganetti returned to Philadelphia and was hired as an offensive quality control coach and assistant offensive line coach, serving under Jeff Stoutland. He helped the Eagles win their first Super Bowl during the 2017 season. In 2019, he was promoted to the assistant running backs coach position. He was retained by newly hired head coach Nick Sirianni and served as an offensive quality control coach from 2021 until 2022 before being promoted to the run game specialist and assistant tight ends coach in 2023.

Personal life 
Paganetti received his bachelor's degree in political science from the University of Oregon in 2012.

References 

Coaches of American football from Massachusetts
1989 births
Philadelphia Eagles coaches
National Football League coaches
Living people